Zaporozhian Host (or Zaporizhian Sich) is a term for a military force inhabiting or originating from Zaporizhzhia, the territory beyond the rapids of the Dnieper River in what is Central Ukraine today, from the 15th to the 18th centuries.

These include:
 Zaporozhian Cossacks, generally
 Registered Cossacks, Zaporizhian warriors who were recorded as cossacks in official registries of the Polish-Lithuanian Commonwealth between 1572 and 1699
 Zaporozhian Sich, a semi-autonomous Cossacks' polity in the 16th–18th centuries
 Cossack Hetmanate, the Cossack state that the Zaporozhian Sich was formed into between 1649 and 1764

 
Early Modern history of Ukraine